The 1997 NASCAR Craftsman Truck Series was the third season of the Craftsman Truck Series, the third highest stock car racing series sanctioned by NASCAR in the United States. Jack Sprague of Hendrick Motorsports won the title.

Teams & drivers 
List of full-time teams at the start of 1997.

Races

Chevy Trucks Challenge 
The inaugural Chevy Trucks Challenge was held January 19 at Walt Disney World Speedway. Jack Sprague won the pole.

Top ten results

 80-Joe Ruttman
 20-Butch Miller
 17-Rich Bickle
  3-Jay Sauter
  6-Rick Carelli
 43-Jimmy Hensley
 98-Kenny Irwin Jr.
 94-Ron Barfield Jr.
 13-Curtis Markham
 86-Stacy Compton

Failed to qualify: 01-Billy Ogle, 04-Thomas Spangler, 08-Felix Giles, 9-Greg Marlowe, 19-Tony Raines, 22-David Smith, 23-T. J. Clark, 25-Andy Genzman, 26-Andy Belmont, 27-Rob Rizzo, 39-Jeff Spraker, 41-Randy Renfrow, 45-Michael Cohen, 51-Perry Tripp, 52-Tobey Butler, 54-Jon Leavy, 56-Darin Brassfield, 59-Shane Doles, 61-Randy Tolsma, 64-Chad Dokken, 69-Jimmy Davis, 73-Bob Schacht, 88-Terry Cook, 92-Mark Kinser

Tobey Butler replaced Bob Brevak in the #34 truck in the race.

NAPA 200 

The NAPA 200 was held March 1 at Tucson Raceway Park. The #18 of Michael Dokken won the pole.

Top ten results

 16-Ron Hornaday Jr.
 17-Rich Bickle
  3-Jay Sauter
 20-Butch Miller
  2-Mike Bliss
 27-Rob Rizzo
 24-Jack Sprague
 43-Jimmy Hensley
 99-Chuck Bown
  7-Dave Rezendes

Failed to qualify: 07-Tammy Jo Kirk, 09-Tim Buckley, 9-Kevin Briscoe, 11-Mike Hurlbert, 15-Mike Cope, 23-T. J. Clark, 25-Andy Genzman, 26-Andy Belmont, 31-Tony Roper, 32-Curtis Markham, 45-Michael Cohen, 52-Tobey Butler, 53-Scott Hansen, 54-Jon Leavy, 55-Lance Hooper, 56-Darin Brassfield, 63-Carlos Serrano, 65-Kenny Allen, 73-Scott Grissom, 88-Terry Cook, 90-Lance Norick

Tony Roper replaced Bob Brevak in the #34 truck in the race.

Florida Dodge Dealers 400 

The Florida Dodge Dealers 400 was held March 16 at Homestead-Miami Speedway. Joe Ruttman won the pole.

Top ten results

 98-Kenny Irwin Jr.
  2-Mike Bliss
 99-Chuck Bown
 93-Mike Skinner
 24-Jack Sprague
 16-Ron Hornaday Jr.
 35-Dave Rezendes
  6-Rick Carelli
 20-Butch Miller
 90-Lance Norick

Failed to qualify: 00-Frank Kimmel, 10-Toby Porter, 23-T. J. Clark, 34-Bob Brevak, 45-Michael Cohen, 51-Terry McCarthy, 54-Jon Leavy, 55-Jim Bown, 61-Randy Tolsma, 62-Blaise Alexander, 68-Bobby Dotter, 68-Ronnie Newman, 73-Bob Schacht, 81-Jerry Glanville, 88-Terry Cook

Tragedy struck during the closing laps of this race when John Nemechek struck the wall in turn 2 on lap 144, suffering massive head injuries. He died five days later.

Chevy Desert Star Classic 

The Chevy Desert Star Classic was held April 20 at Phoenix International Raceway. Jack Sprague won the pole.

Top ten results

 24-Jack Sprague
 80-Joe Ruttman
  2-Mike Bliss
 16-Ron Hornaday Jr.
 17-Rich Bickle
 29-Bob Keselowski
 35-Dave Rezendes
 99-Chuck Bown
 10-Toby Porter
  6-Rick Carelli

Failed to qualify: 13-Mike Colabucci, 19-Tony Raines, 25-Andy Genzman, 26-Andy Belmont, 27-Rob Rizzo, 38-Doug Adams, 54-Jon Leavy, 55-Jim Bown, 61-Randy Tolsma, 92-Mark Kinser, 04-Tommy Spangler

Craftsman 200 

The Craftsman 200 was held May 3 at Portland Speedway. Rich Bickle won the pole.

Top ten results

 17-Rich Bickle
 16-Ron Hornaday Jr.
 20-Butch Miller
 24-Jack Sprague
 29-Bob Keselowski
  2-Mike Bliss
 19-Tony Raines
 14-Rick Crawford
 52-Tobey Butler
  3-Jay Sauter

Failed to qualify: 10-Toby Porter, 23-T. J. Clark, 25-Andy Genzman, 56-Brandon Butler, 57-Brian Cunningham

NAPACARD 200 

The NAPACARD 200 was held May 10 at Evergreen Speedway. Rich Bickle won the pole.

Top ten results

 17-Rich Bickle
 24-Jack Sprague
 18-Michael Dokken
 80-Joe Ruttman
 98-Kenny Irwin Jr.
 29-Bob Keselowski
  2-Mike Bliss
 86-Stacy Compton
 16-Ron Hornaday Jr.
 20-Butch Miller

Failed to qualify: 01-Dave Goulet, 4-Bill Sedgwick, 57-Brian Cunningham, 77-Lonnie Rush Jr., 87-Jim Bown, 92-Mark Kinser

Western Auto/Parts America 200 

The Western Auto/Parts America 200 was held May 24 at I-70 Speedway. Rich Bickle won the pole.

Top ten results

 19-Tony Raines*
 43-Jimmy Hensley
 99-Chuck Bown
 17-Rich Bickle
 20-Butch Miller
 80-Joe Ruttman
  6-Rick Carelli
  2-Mike Bliss
 31-Tony Roper
 24-Jack Sprague

Failed to qualify: 27-Rob Rizzo, 37-Scot Walters, 46-Marc Robe, 61-Randy Tolsma, 90-Lance Norick, 92-Mark Kinser

This was Raines' first career Craftsman Truck Series win.

Pennzoil Discount Center 200 

The Pennzoil Discount Center 200 was held May 31 at New Hampshire International Speedway. Jack Sprague won the pole.

Top ten results

  3-Jay Sauter
 24-Jack Sprague
  6-Rick Carelli
 44-Boris Said
 98-Kenny Irwin Jr.
 14-Rick Crawford
 35-Dave Rezendes
 66-Bryan Reffner
 80-Joe Ruttman
 99-Chuck Bown

Failed to qualify: 39-Jeff Spraker, 47-Danny Hieber

Pronto Auto Parts 400K 

The inaugural Pronto Auto Parts 400K was held June 6 at Texas Motor Speedway. Mike Bliss won the pole.

Top ten results

 98-Kenny Irwin Jr.
 44-Boris Said
 14-Rick Crawford
 99-Chuck Bown
  2-Mike Bliss
 29-Bob Keselowski
 35-Dave Rezendes
 61-Randy Tolsma
 80-Joe Ruttman
 42-Ken Bouchard

Failed to qualify: none

Loadhandler 200 

The Loadhandler 200 was held June 21 at Bristol Motor Speedway. Ron Hornaday Jr. won the pole.

Top ten results

 16-Ron Hornaday Jr.
 17-Rich Bickle
  3-Jay Sauter
  6-Rick Carelli
 80-Joe Ruttman
 14-Rick Crawford
 24-Jack Sprague
 43-Jimmy Hensley
 99-Chuck Bown
 66-Bryan Reffner

Failed to qualify: 0-James Boulton, 01-Billy Ogle Jr., 11-Eddie Johnson, 22-Tommy Humphries, 25-Andy Genzman, 57-Brian Cunningham, 70-Joe Buford

NAPA 200 

The NAPA AutoCare 200 was held June 29 at Nazareth Speedway. Mike Bliss won the pole.

Top ten results

 24-Jack Sprague
 80-Joe Ruttman
  2-Mike Bliss
 17-Rich Bickle
 18-Michael Dokken
  6-Rick Carelli
 99-Chuck Bown
 37-David Green
  3-Jay Sauter
 19-Tony Raines

Failed to qualify: none

Sears DieHard 200 

The Sears DieHard 200 was held July 5 at The Milwaukee Mile. Jack Sprague won the pole.

Top ten results

 16-Ron Hornaday Jr.
  3-Jay Sauter
 17-Rich Bickle
 24-Jack Sprague
  6-Rick Carelli
 52-Mike Wallace
 19-Tony Raines
 43-Jimmy Hensley
 80-Joe Ruttman -1
 99-Chuck Bown -1

Failed to qualify: 4-Bill Sedgwick, 25-Andy Genzman, 63-Cindy Peterson, 73-Bob Schacht

Link-Belt Construction Equipment 225 

The Link-Belt Construction Equipment 225 was held July 12 at Louisville Motor Speedway. Jimmy Hensley won the pole.

Top ten results

 16-Ron Hornaday Jr.*
 80-Joe Ruttman
 43-Jimmy Hensley
 19-Tony Raines
 17-Rich Bickle
 86-Stacy Compton
 37-Scot Walters
 24-Jack Sprague
 44-Boris Said
 52-Mike Wallace

Failed to qualify: 06-Billy Pauch, 11-Eddie Johnson, 22-Tommy Humphries, 39-Jeff Spraker, 41-Bill Sedgwick, 91-Gary Brooks

 Ron Hornaday Jr. led every lap en route to the win.

Colorado 250 by Snap-On Tools 

The Colorado 250 by Snap-On Tools was held July 19 at Colorado National Speedway. Ron Hornaday Jr. won the pole.

Top ten results

 16-Ron Hornaday Jr.
  2-Mike Bliss
 86-Stacy Compton
  3-Jay Sauter
 17-Rich Bickle
 14-Rick Crawford
  6-Rick Carelli
 43-Jimmy Hensley
 19-Tony Raines
 20-Butch Miller

Failed to qualify: none

Lund Look 275K 

The Lund Look 275K was held July 27 at Heartland Park Topeka*. Joe Ruttman won the pole.

Top ten results

 80-Joe Ruttman
 24-Jack Sprague
 16-Ron Hornaday Jr.
 55-Dorsey Schroeder
 93-Mike Skinner
  1-Bobby Hamilton
 43-Jimmy Hensley
 14-Rick Crawford
  6-Rick Carelli
 19-Tony Raines

Failed to qualify: 5-Robbie Pyle, 45-Michael Cohen, 54-Jon Leavy, 82-Randy Nelson

 This was the first Craftsman Truck Series race at Heartland Park Topeka held on the 2.1 mile configuration. The previous two races were on the shorter 1.8 mile layout.

Cummins 200 

The Cummins 200 was held July 31 at Indianapolis Raceway Park. Jimmy Hensley won the pole.

Top ten results

 16-Ron Hornaday Jr.
 24-Jack Sprague
 43-Jimmy Hensley
 80-Joe Ruttman
 53-Mike McLaughlin
 61-Randy Tolsma
 98-Kenny Irwin Jr.
  6-Rick Carelli
 35-Dave Rezendes
 17-Rich Bickle

Failed to qualify: 9-Greg Marlowe, 26-Jerry Robertson, 39-Jeff Spraker, 47-Danny Hieber, 58-Chris Horn, 71-Gary St. Amant, 73-Bob Schacht, 77-Eliseo Salazar

Jimmy Hensley led the first 200 laps but lost the lead with 2 to go in the green-white-checker.

Stevens Beil/Genuine Parts 200 

The Stevens Beil/Genuine Parts 200 was held August 9 at Flemington Speedway. Terry Cook won the pole.

Top ten results

 16-Ron Hornaday Jr.
 80-Joe Ruttman
 17-Rich Bickle
 24-Jack Sprague
  6-Rick Carelli
  3-Jay Sauter
 52-Mike Wallace
 20-Butch Miller
 31-Tony Roper
  2-Mike Bliss

Failed to qualify: 02-Eric Norris, 06-Billy Pauch, 11-Eddie Johnson, 12-Andy Genzman, 47-Danny Hieber

Federated Auto Parts 250 

The Federated Auto Parts 250 was held August 16 at Nashville Speedway USA. Mike Bliss won the pole.

Top ten results

 24-Jack Sprague
 16-Ron Hornaday Jr.
 20-Butch Miller
 35-Dave Rezendes
 86-Stacy Compton
 17-Rich Bickle -1
 99-Chuck Bown -1
 14-Rick Crawford -1
  2-Mike Bliss -1
  6-Rick Carelli -1

Failed to qualify: 00-Frank Kimmel, 02-Eric Norris, 4-Bill Sedgwick, 13-Mike Colabucci, 57-Brian Cunningham, 62-Blaise Alexander, 77-Doug George

Parts America 150 

The Parts America 150 was held August 24 at Watkins Glen International. Ron Fellows won the pole.

Top ten results

 48-Ron Fellows
  2-Mike Bliss
 24-Jack Sprague
 80-Joe Ruttman
 16-Ron Hornaday Jr.
 43-Jimmy Hensley
 18-Ted Christopher
 63-Ricky Johnson
 62-Blaise Alexander
  6-Rick Carelli

Failed to qualify: 12-Andy Genzman, 26-Doug George, 28-Lou Gigliotti, 54-Jon Leavy, 72-Tammy Jo Kirk, 88-Terry Cook, 90-Lance Norick

Virginia Is For Lovers 200 

The Virginia Is For Lovers 200 was held September 4 at Richmond International Raceway. The #16 of Ron Hornaday Jr. won the pole.

Top ten results

 29-Bob Keselowski*
 24-Jack Sprague
  3-Jay Sauter
 17-Rich Bickle
 98-Kenny Irwin Jr.
 53-Ken Schrader
  2-Mike Bliss
 99-Chuck Bown
 61-Randy Tolsma
 20-Butch Miller

Failed to qualify: 02-Eric Norris, 05-John Blewett, 12-Greg Marlowe, 22-Tom Baldwin, 27-Rob Rizzo, 39-Jeff Spraker, 42-Mike Ewanitsko, 55-Kevin Grubb, 65-Andy Houston, 70-Joe Buford, 75-Kevin Harvick, 81-Philip Morris, 87-Robert Huffman, 88-Terry Cook, 92-Doug George, 93-Dana Dorman

 This was Bob Keselowski's one and only career victory in the Craftsman Truck Series.

 This was Dodge's first win in the Truck Series.

Hanes 250 

The Hanes 250 was held September 27 at Martinsville Speedway. Rich Bickle won the pole.

Top ten results

 17-Rich Bickle
 28-Ernie Irvan
  2-Mike Bliss
 43-Jimmy Hensley
 51-Bobby Hamilton
 20-Butch Miller
  3-Jay Sauter
 98-Kenny Irwin Jr.
 86-Stacy Compton
 24-Jack Sprague

Failed to qualify: 03-Kirk Shelmerdine, 11-Ronnie Newman, 22-Tom Baldwin, 25-Andy Genzman, 26-Jerry Robertson, 39-Jeff Spraker, 40-Bill Sedgwick, 41-Randy Renfrow, 42-Mike Ewanitsko, 45-Michael Cohen, 55-Kevin Grubb, 62-Blaise Alexander, 72-Tammy Jo Kirk, 75-Rick Markle, 83-Joe Gaita, 88-Terry Cook, 90-Lance Norick

Kragen/Exide 151 

The Kragen/Exide 151 was held October 5 at Sears Point Raceway. The #55 of Dave Rezendes won the pole.

Top ten results

 80-Joe Ruttman
 18-Tom Hubert
  3-Jay Sauter
 63-Ricky Johnson
 24-Jack Sprague
 43-Jimmy Hensley
  6-Rick Carelli
 35-Doug George
 46-Joe Bean
 86-Stacy Compton

Failed to qualify: 4-Bill Sedgwick, 40-Bo Lemler, 83-Joe Huffaker, 85-Milan Garrett

 An incident between Boris Said and Rich Bickle with five laps to go (and subsequent retaliation) caused NASCAR to fine Said $5,000 and put him on probation for the rest of the year. Bickle was also put on probation.

 Dave Rezendes was leading the event when he crashed on his own in the Esses with three laps to go.

Dodge California Truckstop 300 

The Dodge California Truckstop 300 was held October 12 at Mesa Marin Raceway. Mike Bliss won the pole.

Top ten results

 61-Randy Tolsma*
 86-Stacy Compton
  2-Mike Bliss
  3-Jay Sauter
 17-Rich Bickle
 14-Rick Crawford
 52-Mike Wallace
 75-Kevin Harvick
 43-Jimmy Hensley
 24-Jack Sprague

Failed to qualify: none

 This was Randy Tolsma's first career Craftsman Truck Series victory.

The No Fear Challenge 

The Inaugural No Fear Challenge was held October 18 at California Speedway. Mike Bliss won the pole.

Top ten results

  2-Mike Bliss
 52-Mike Wallace
 98-Kenny Irwin Jr.
 28-Ernie Irvan
 61-Randy Tolsma
 24-Jack Sprague
  1-Michael Waltrip
 29-Bob Keselowski
 16-Ron Hornaday Jr.
 14-Rick Crawford

Failed to qualify: 9-Ron Esau, 46-Joe Bean, 63-Ricky Johnson, 82-Randy Nelson

GM Goodwrench Delco 300 

The GM Goodwrench Delco 300 was held November 1 at Phoenix International Raceway. Mike Bliss won the pole.

Top ten results

 80-Joe Ruttman
 99-Chuck Bown
 24-Jack Sprague
 98-Kenny Irwin Jr.
  6-Rick Carelli
 52-Mike Wallace
  3-Jay Sauter
 20-Butch Miller
 16-Ron Hornaday Jr.
  2-Mike Bliss

Failed to qualify: 06-Billy Pauch, 27-Kenny Hendrick, 40-Eddie Sharp, 77-Rob Morgan, 82-Randy Nelson, 84-Billy Wilburn, 85-Milan Garrett, 90-Lance Norick

Carquest Auto Parts 420K 

The Carquest Auto Parts 420K was held November 9 at Las Vegas Motor Speedway. Jack Sprague won the pole.

Top ten results

 80-Joe Ruttman
 24-Jack Sprague
 16-Ron Hornaday Jr.
  3-Jay Sauter
  2-Mike Bliss
  6-Rick Carelli
 52-Mike Wallace
 75-Kevin Harvick
 99-Chuck Bown -1
 14-Rick Crawford -1

Failed to qualify: 01-Dave Goulet, 02-Rick McCray, 4-Tim Buckley, 11-Brett Bodine, 12-Tony Toste, 15-Rob Morgan, 18-Kevin Cywinski, 22-Kenny Hendrick, 23-T. J. Clark, 26-Perry Tripp, 27-Tammy Jo Kirk, 36-Jerry Robertson, 40-Eddie Sharp, 46-Joe Bean, 58-Wayne Jacks, 60-Tobey Butler, 65-Andy Houston, 69-Jimmy Davis, 82-Randy Nelson, 84-Billy Wilburn, 85-Milan Garrett, 88-Terry Cook

Final points standings 

(key) Bold – Pole position awarded by time. Italics – Pole position earned by points standings. * – Most laps led.